The 2018–19 Liga II was the 6th season, since its reintroduction in 2013, of the second level women's football league of the Romanian football league system. 16 teams divided in 2 series played in the competition that consisted of a double round-robin lasting 14 stages, totaling 112 matches. In addition, a two-legged play-off was played to determine one more promoted team at the end of the season, since CFR Timișoara withdrew from Liga I and vacated a place.

Team changes

To Liga II
Promoted from Liga III
 Vulpițele Galbene Roman (winners of 2017–18 Liga III, Seria I)
 Banat Girls Reșița (winners of 2017–18 Liga III, Seria II) 
 Venus Maramureș (4th place in 2017–18 Liga III, Seria II)

Relegated from Liga I
 Luceafărul Filiași (took over the place of Liga I relegated team Real Craiova, 10th place in the 2017–18 Liga I)

From Liga II
Promoted to Liga I
 FC Universitatea Galați (winners of 2017–18 Liga II, Seria I) 
 Independența Baia Mare (winners of 2017–18 Liga II, Seria II)

Relegated to Liga III
 Luceafărul 2 Filiași (took over the place of Real 2 Craiova, 6th place in the 2017–18 Liga II, Seria II, but transferred to Liga III as two teams from the same club cannot play in the same league)

Disbanded
 Armonia Dolhești (7th place in 2017–18 Liga I, Seria I)

Excluded and spared teams
Armonia Dolhești was disbanded in the summer of 2018, so Viitorul Reghin (8th place in 2017–18 Liga II, Seria I) was spared from relegation.

Luceafărul Filiași took over Real Craiova's spot after its relegation from 2017–18 Liga I, although some viewed it as just a name change.  The move was possible by disaffiliating the old Real Craiova club and transferring the senior team components to Luceafărul Filiași Sport School, along with their club president, local politician Fănel Văduva.  As such, the first squad was able to continue in Liga II, as they relegated at the end of the 2017–18 Liga I, thus they were not required to start in Liga III as it happens with new teams. Consequently, the spot of Real 2 Craiova, which was taken over by Luceafărul 2 Filiași was transferred to Liga III, as two teams from the same club cannot play in the same league.

Teams

Seria I

Seria II

League tables and Results

Seria I League table

Seria II League table

Promotion play-off
The second best placed team in Seria I faces the second best placed team in Seria II  (excluding second teams of Liga I clubs) to decide the last promoted club to 2019-20 Liga I, after CFR Timișoara withdrew during the 2018–19 Liga I season, and vacated a spot.

References

External links
 Official site

Rom
Fem
Women's football in Romania